Peter Norfolk defeated David Wagner in the final, 6–2, 6–3 to win the inaugural quad singles wheelchair tennis title at the 2008 Australian Open.

Seeds

Draw

Finals

Wheelchair Quad Singles
2008 Quad Singles